Eight ships of the French Navy have borne the name Tonnerre ("thunder"):
  (1696–1713), formerly HMS Thunder, a captured 4-gun bomb ship.
  (1759–1768), a gunboat
  (1785–1807), a 3-gun gunboat
  (1808–1809), a 74-gun 
  (1838–1878), a 4-gun wheeled steam corvette
  (1875–1921), an armoured coast-guard
  (1946–1955), an armoured barge in Indochina
 , a  presently in service.

Reference and sources 
 Les bâtiments ayant porté le nom de Tonnerre
 Dictionnaire des bâtiments de la flotte de guerre de Colbert à nos jours, Jean-Michel Roche

French Navy ship names